Tsovinar may refer to:
 Tsovinar, Armenia, a town
 Tsovinar (goddess), a deity